Kudditji Kngwarreye (or "Goob") (1938 – 23 January 2017) was an Australian Aboriginal artist from the Utopia community in the Northern Territory. He was the brother (through kinship) of the late Emily Kame Kngwarreye and like his skin sister Emily, was one of the most prominent and successful artists in the history of contemporary indigenous Australian art.

Life

His country was given the name Utopia by German settlers, who transformed the land into cattle stations.  He became a skilled stockman. In recent years the Australian nation has begun to recognise the key role Aboriginal people played in the development of the cattle industry in Australia. Kudditji witnessed the success of Albert Namatjira, and experienced the 1967 referendum. Kudditji and his countrymen had their land claim approved in 1979 and throughout the years he has felt the effects of different government policies on Indigenous people of the Northern Territory.

Kngwarreye took up painting around 1986; his highly intuitive and gestural method of painting was not welcomed by galleries, and he was encouraged to paint in the fashionable style of the time, executing works with detailed infill. After seeing Emily Kame Kngwarreye catapult onto the Australian and international art scene, Kudditji resumed his exploration into the abstract, which he continued until he "put down the brush" in 2015. Kudditji participated in many international exhibitions and became known for his depictions of his Dreamings; their abstract imagery, bold colour use and intuitive interplay with space and form has cemented his name in the Aboriginal art scene.

He had a traditional bush upbringing and worked as a stockman and mine worker for many years.

Over the years his Dreamings have profoundly evolved into extraordinary juxtaposed colour fields, startling in both composition and hue. Harsh or soft and often surprising to the Western eye, his painterly style maps out the creation, his country, and his traditional Dreamings. While his spatial, painterly compositions have a Rothko-esque quality to them, the work of this Anmatyerre elder from the Northern Territory is clearly a unique Australian voice.

In 2006 Kudditji was named as one of the top 50 most collectible artists in Australia by Art Collector magazine.
Kudditji painted from 1986 to 2013, when he became ill.

In 2013, Kate Owen Gallery presented the exhibition "The Master Returns"a long-awaited new body of work by Kudditji and his first since overcoming a difficult battle with illness. Gallery Owner and Director, Mr Geoff Henderson commented at the time, "Quite simply, this is the most powerful and compelling body of works I’ve seen from him". Kudditji continued to paint until 2015 when illness prevented him from painting any longer. Two years later in January 2017 he died peacefully in a retirement home in Alice Springs.

Art style
Acrylic paintings were introduced to Utopia in 1988/89 by Rodney Gooch and others of the Central Australian Aboriginal Media Association (CAAMA). An exhibition of some of the paintings of these artists' work organised by CAAMA was held called "A Summer Project", where Kngwarreye's work got immediate attention from critics. The attention she received coincided with the worldwide art boom that occurred at this time.

Whereas the predominant Aboriginal style was based on the one developed with some assistance from art teacher Geoffrey Bardon at the Papunya community in 1971 of many similarly sized dots carefully lying next to each other in distinct patterns members of the Utopia community were encouraged by Mike Mitchell of Muk Muk Fine Art (now Mitchell Fine Art) and after intensive workshopping and trialling, the quintessential Kudditji brushwork emerged.  Kngwarreye further refined and created his own original artistic style.

Like many of the desert artists, he mastered the use of acrylic paint on canvas. His use of colour combined with simple shapes tell the stories of one of his inherited ancestral totems - the Emu Ancestors, their travels and teachings depicting various interpretations of the Emu Dreaming sites and ceremonies associated with men's business.

Initially, his highly intuitive and gestural method of painting that he became known for was not welcomed by galleries.  Instead, he was encouraged to paint in the fashionable style of the time, executing works with overt iconography, figurative elements and detailed infill. After seeing the great Utopian artist Emily Kame Kngwarreye catapult on to the Australian and International Art scene using a technique similar to his, Kudditji resumed his exploration of the abstract.

From early 2003 Kudditji began to experiment with paint to eradicate the pointillist style altogether and use a heavily loaded paint brush to sweep broadly across the canvas in stages, similar to the western landscape plane. These paintings were romantic images of his country, accentuating the colour and form of the landscape, including the depth of the sky in the raining season and in the summer heat.

While the early body of this work was admired by an astute few it was not well received at the time. Today Kudditji's works have a national and international following. He has been represented in major exhibitions and has gained worldwide recognition for his traditional depictions of his dreamings.

For international collectors of contemporary art, Kudditji quickly became an obvious addition. Collectors saw mastery in his paint handling technique and appreciated his floating fields of luminous colour.  Whilst many international visitors compared him to the great American abstract impressionist, Mark Rothko, Kudditji was totally unaware of any similarities.  He was just painting his country, his Dreamings, his way.

Emu dreaming
During his younger days Kudditji frequently took the young boys/men hunting emu in these lands, merging tradition with practice as part of their initiation as men. It is the land of this experience that Kudditji painted his "Emu Dreamings" and "My Country" works.

While painting, Kudditji could be heard singing. On one level it was a way of infusing his works with stories of the land; the ancestors, hunts, travels and the food and water of Anmatyerre country. On other levels, the act of painting reminded him of home and his singing was his way of maintaining his bond with his country, far away from Alice Springs. He painted the country he longed to see again, and, at least in that moment of singing and painting, he returned to his country, if only in his heart and mind.

Kudditji held the responsibility of an elder, and frequently took the young boys/men hunting emu across his ancestral lands, merging tradition with practice as part of their initiation as men.

Collections
Araluen Arts Centre, Alice Springs
Hank Ebes Collection, Melbourne
Macquarie University, Sydney
University of New South Wales, Sydney
Guilleman and Sordello Collection, France
R. M. Barokh Antiques, California
Mbantua Gallery Permanent Collection Alice Springs

Exhibitions
Solo:
2016: Singing Up Country | Kudditji Kngwarreye, Kate Owen Gallery, Sydney
2016: Kudditji Kngwarreye - A master painter there is only one of him, Mandel Aboriginal Art Gallery, Melbourne 
2014: Kudditji Kngwarreye, Japingka Gallery, Perth
2014: Earth + Sky, Fireworks Gallery, Brisbane
2013: Kudditji: Landscapes in the Family Tradition, Booker-Lowe Gallery, Houston, Texas USA
2013: Colours of Dreaming | Kudditji Kngwarreye, Mitchell Fine Art, Brisbane
2013: The Master Returns, Kate Owen Gallery, Sydney
2011: Kudditji Kngwarreye, Kate Owen Gallery, Sydney
2011: COLOURFIELD: new paintings, Fireworks gallery, Brisbane
2010: Kudditji Kngwarreye, Kate Owen Gallery, Sydney
2010: Kudditji Kngwarreye, Palya Proper Fine Arts Alice Springs
2009: Kudditji Kngwarreye: Pastels, Kate Owen Gallery, Sydney
2008: My Country, Kudditji Kngwarreye, Central Art Aboriginal Store, Alice Springs
2008: 30 Emu Dreamings, Kate Owen Gallery, Sydney
2008: My Country, Japingka Gallery, Perth
2006: Masterwork, Vivien Anderson Gallery, Melbourne
2006: My Country, Japingka Gallery, Perth
2006: Two Fields, Fireworks Gallery, Brisbane
2005: Waterhole Aboriginal Art, Danks Street, Sydney
2005: New Paintings, Vivien Anderson Gallery, Melbourne
2005: Colours in Country, Art Mob, Hobart, Tasmania
2004: My Country, New Paintings, Vivien Anderson Gallery, Melbourne
2004: My Country, Japingka Gallery, Perth
2004: Waterhole Aboriginal Art, Sofitel Wentworth Hotel Exhibition, Sydney
2003: New Paintings, Vivien Anderson Gallery, Melbourne
1999: New Paintings, Chapel off Chapel, Melbourne

Group:
2016: Spoilt for Choice- a director's choice exhibition, Kate Gwen Gallery, Sydney
2015: Signs and Traces - Contemporary Aboriginal Art, Cultural Institute Zamek, Pozan, Poland
2015: From the Vaults - highlights from the Collectors' Gallery, Kate Owen Gallery, Sydney
2014: Vast Interiors, Kate Owen Gallery, Sydney
2012: The Colourists: Kudditji Kngwarreye and Lorna Napurrula Fencer, Japingka Gallery, perth
2013: Sky and Desert, Foundation Burkhardt-Felder Arts et Culture, Switzerland
2010: Utopia: Eastern Anmatyerre Artists, Neo Gallery, Brisbane
2009: Aboriginal Art, Mary Place Gallery, Sydney
2009: Reves Aborigines, Musee Arts et Histoire de Bormes-Les-Mimosas, Bormes-Les-Mimosas, France
2008: From the Air, Fireworks Gallery, Brisbane
2008: Black & White: Inspired by Landscape, Kate Owen Gallery, Sydney
2006: New Paintings, Vivien Anderson Gallery, Melbourne
2005: Big Country, Gallery Gondwana, Alice Springs
2005: Fresh from the Central Desert, Canberra Grammar School, Canberra
2004: Two Senior Men, Art Mob Gallery, Tasmania
2004: Australian Exhibition Centre, Chicago
2004: Heartbeat - Living Country, Wenthworth Hotel, Sydney
2004: Spirit of Colour, Depot Gallery, Sydney
2002: The Contemporaries, Contemporary Artspace, Brisbane
2000: Mia Mia, Aboriginal Art gallery, Melbourne
1999: Chapel Off, Chapel gallery, Melbourne
1992: Tjukurrpa, Museum fur Volkerkunde, Basel, Switzerland
1991: Central Australian Aboriginal Art & Craft Exhibition, Araluen Centre, Alice Springs
1990: Art Dock, Contemporary Art from Australia, Nouméa, New Caledonia

Artists influenced
Artists around the world were inspired by the work of Kudditji Kngwarreye, including Melbourne-based painter Vincent Fantauzzo (a four-time Archibald People's Choice Award winner). Vincent's 2016 exhibition Last Contact at Nanda Hobbs Gallery showcased five triptychs; each containing a portrait of a great Central Australian artist, together with a painting by the Indigenous artist and a landscape by Fantuazzo. His great affection and respect for Kudditji is undeniable "He kind of looks like a character from Lord of the Rings but there's nothing fake about him. Everything is genuine and real."

Fantauzzo has commented on the sense of urgency he felt to complete his portrait, when in 2015 Kudditji fell ill and there were fears he may not recover. "I get goosebumps thinking about it. That's the time when I realised what he meant to me and what he taught me." Fantuazzo entered his portrait of Kngwarreye in the 2015 Archibald Prize as well as Kngwarreye's artwork in the Wynne Prize. Neither painting was shown in the finalist exhibition.

Another artist to have been positively influenced by Kudditji Kngwarreye is Philip Hunter Lindsay, a Sydney-based landscape and portrait artist and finalist in the Art Gallery of New South Wales 2011 Sir John Sulman Prize. Philip claims to have taken extensive inspiration for Kngwarreye, particularly his early life living as a stockman in the remote parts of central Australia.  Philip Hunter Lindsay has painted over a dozen unique, sought after colourful portraits of Kudditji Kngwarreye over a decade of his admiration for the unique, Australian artist.

Awards
In 2006 Kudditji was named as one of the top 50 most collectible artists in Australia by Art Collector magazine.

See also
Australian art

References

General references

Ryan, Judith (2008). Across the Desert: Aboriginal Batik from Central Australia. Melbourne: National Gallery of Victoria. .

Australian Art Collector magazine, issue 2, October – December 1997

External links
 Emily Kame Kngwarreye News at Aboriginal Art Directory
 Emily Kam Ngwarray at the Art Gallery of New South Wales

1938 births
2017 deaths
Australian Aboriginal artists
People from the Northern Territory